Amanda Laura Bynes (born April 3, 1986) is an American actress. She is known for her work in television and film throughout the 1990s and 2000s. Bynes began her career as a child actress, working on the Nickelodeon sketch comedy series All That (1996–2000), and had a breakthrough starring in its spin-off series The Amanda Show (1999–2002) and receiving several accolades.

During her mid-teens, Bynes played Holly Tyler in The WB sitcom What I Like About You (2002–2006), and made her film debut in the comedy Big Fat Liar (2002). She went on to star in a number of successful films, including the comedy What a Girl Wants (2003) and the animated film Robots (2005); she has received praise for her roles in the sports comedy She's the Man (2006), the musical Hairspray (2007), and the comedy-drama Easy A (2010).

In her highly publicized personal life, Bynes has struggled with substance abuse and faced legal issues. She announced an indefinite hiatus from acting in 2010 as she struggled with various personal problems. In 2018, Bynes expressed interest in returning to television acting. She was in a conservatorship from August 2013 to March 2022.

Early life
Bynes was born in Thousand Oaks, California, on April 3, 1986, the youngest of three children born to Lynn (née Organ), a dental assistant and office manager, and Rick Bynes, a dentist. Her father is Catholic and is of Irish, Lithuanian, and Polish descent. Her mother is Jewish, and was born to a Canadian couple whose families were from Poland, Russia, and Romania.

Career

1993–2005: Child acting and breakthrough 

Bynes began professionally acting at age seven, appearing in a television advertisement for Buncha Crunch candies. During her childhood, she also appeared on stage in versions of Annie, The Secret Garden, The Music Man, and The Sound of Music. Later she attended a comedy camp at the Los Angeles Laugh Factory and was spotted by a Nickelodeon producer before being cast by the network on the sketch comedy series All That, where she played various roles from 1996 to 2000. The show brought Bynes much recognition, and she won a Kids' Choice Award in 2000. Bynes was also a regular member of the series Figure It Out from 1997 to 1999. At the age of 13, Bynes starred in the All That spin-off comedy The Amanda Show from 1999 to 2002. She had her breakthrough on the shows earning praise and acclaim. She won four Kids' Choice Awards and received two Young Artist Award nominations.

In 2002, Bynes made her feature film debut in Big Fat Liar starring as Kaylee, best friend of co-star Frankie Muniz's character. Although the film had a mixed reception, it was a commercial success; she won a Kids' Choice Award for her performance. Also in 2002, she landed a starring role in the WB sitcom What I Like About You from 2002 to 2006 co-starring with Jennie Garth. The series garnered positive reviews and Bynes received a number of nominations from the Teen Choice Awards and the Young Artist Awards. In 2003, Bynes appeared on the cover of Vanity Fair July 2003 edition. She had a voice role in the direct-to-video film Charlotte's Web 2: Wilbur's Great Adventure, which was panned by critics. She also had a voice role as Piper Pinwheeler in the 2005 animated film Robots, which was a commercial success. Also in 2005, she starred the romantic comedy Love Wrecked.

2006–2010: Mainstream film successes and hiatus 
Bynes was named one of Teen Peoples "25 Hottest Stars Under 25" in 2006. In 2006, Bynes starred in the sport comedy film She's the Man, based on William Shakespeare's Twelfth Night. She portrays Viola Hastings, a girl who pretends to be her twin brother to play with the boys' soccer team at an elite boarding school after the girls soccer team at her Prep school gets cut. Critic Roger Ebert wrote "Of Amanda Bynes let us say that she is sunny and plucky and somehow finds a way to play her impossible role without clearing her throat more than six or eight times. More importantly, we like her." Magazine Bustle wrote in 2018: "She's The Man was hot and hilarious and anxiety-inducing. It was perfect, and Bynes was a revelation in it."

In 2007, Bynes starred as Penny Pingleton, a sheltered young girl, in the musical comedy film Hairspray. The film was a critical and commercial success premiering in over 3,000 theaters, the largest debut for any musical film. It went on to become Bynes's most successful film at the time, and she and the rest of the cast were acclaimed for their performances. She won the Critics' Choice Award for Best Acting Ensemble and received a Screen Actors Guild Award nomination in 2008, among others. She was also featured on the Hairspray soundtrack, which went on to get a Grammy nomination. It was announced Bynes would reprise her role in Hairspray 2, but the project was canceled.

In August 2007, Bynes teamed up with Steve & Barry's to create her own fashion line called Dear, consisting of apparel and accessories. The line was cut short when Steve & Barry's filed Chapter 11 bankruptcy in 2008. Bynes' next role was in another comedy, Sydney White, released in 2007. The film was a flop although Bynes's performance was praised. Review aggregator site Rotten Tomatoes wrote "Amanda Bynes is charming, but Sydney White is a poorly adapted take on Snow White, relying on tired ethnic stereotypes laughs."

In 2008, Bynes appeared in the Lifetime Television movie Living Proof as the student assistant of Harry Connick, Jr.'s character. The film and the cast were praised. In 2009, she was set to star in the comedy Post Grad, but dropped out with no reason revealed and was replaced by Alexis Bledel amid rumors that she was having difficulties. In 2010, she co-starred alongside the then-relatively unknown Emma Stone in the comedy Easy A. She starred as Marianne Bryant playing a popular and judgmental high-school student. The film was a critical and commercial success, with Stone and Bynes receiving critical praise for their performances. In the same year, Bynes started shooting the comedy film Hall Pass but dropped out of the film and was replaced by Alexandra Daddario. In July 2010, Bynes announced an indefinite hiatus from acting but later stated in 2018 that she intended to return to television acting. Bynes along with some former All That cast members were to reunite at 90's Con in March 2023. It would have been Bynes's first major public appearance since her conservatorship ended, but Bynes did not attend.

Personal life
In 2007, Bynes described herself as Jewish and said: "As far as religion, I was raised both. I learned about both [Judaism and Catholicism]. My parents said it was up to me to decide [which faith to adhere to] when I grew up. I'm sort of a spiritual person anyway. I haven't decided yet [on a religion]. I don't know yet exactly what I believe." In 2008, Bynes briefly dated Seth MacFarlane after voicing a character in an episode of MacFarlane's show Family Guy.

Since childhood Bynes has been interested in illustration and fashion design. In December 2013, Bynes enrolled at the Fashion Institute of Design & Merchandising in Irvine for 2014. In 2018, she received her associate's of art degree in merchandise product development and announced her intentions to start a bachelor's degree program. In 2019, Bynes graduated from FIDM.

Mental health and substance abuse problems
In 2012, Bynes was charged with driving under the influence (DUI) in West Hollywood. Two years later, the charge was dropped and she received a three-year probation. In May 2013, Bynes was charged with reckless endangerment and marijuana possession after she was found smoking in the lobby of her Manhattan apartment building. When officers entered her 36th-floor apartment, she allegedly threw a bong out the window. A New York County judge dismissed the case against her in June 2014.

In July 2013, Ventura County sheriff's deputies detained her after she allegedly started a small fire in the driveway of a stranger in Thousand Oaks. She was hospitalized under a 72-hour mental-health evaluation hold. Bynes's parents filed for conservatorship of their daughter shortly after her hospitalization began. In August, Bynes' mother was granted a temporary conservatorship over Bynes's affairs.

In October 2014, Bynes accused her father of emotional and sexual abuse in a series of tweets; after her parents protested and claimed innocence, Bynes tweeted that her father had never abused her adding: "The microchip in my brain made me say those things but he's the one that ordered them to microchip me".
Days later Bynes' mother again received conservatorship of Amanda Bynes. Soon afterward Bynes announced that she had been diagnosed with bipolar disorder. In August 2018, paperwork was filed to continue said conservatorship until August 2020.

In 2018, Bynes stated she had been sober for four years with the help of her parents. She also apologized for what she said on Twitter during her years of substance abuse: "I'm really ashamed and embarrassed with the things I said. I can't turn back time but if I could, I would. And I'm so sorry to whoever I hurt and whoever I lied about because it truly eats away at me." In an interview, Bynes stated that during her days of substance abuse she experimented with cocaine and MDMA, but the drug she "abused the most" was the ADHD prescription medication Adderall.
 
In February 2022, Bynes filed to end her conservatorship. Her attorney stated that Bynes believed her condition was improved and protection of the court was no longer necessary. Attorneys for her parents stated that they supported her in ending it. The conservatorship was officially terminated on March 22, 2022.

Filmography

Film

Television

Soundtrack appearances

Awards and nominations

References

External links

 
 
 
 

1986 births
20th-century American actresses
20th-century American comedians
21st-century American actresses
21st-century American comedians
Actresses from Los Angeles
American child actresses
American fashion designers
American film actresses
American people of Canadian descent
American sketch comedians
American women comedians
American people of Irish descent
American people of Lithuanian descent
American people of Polish descent
American people of Polish-Jewish descent
American people of Romanian-Jewish descent
American people of Russian-Jewish descent
American television actresses
Television personalities from Los Angeles
American women television personalities
American voice actresses
Comedians from California
Jewish American actresses
Jewish fashion designers
Jewish American female comedians
Living people
People from Thousand Oaks, California
People with bipolar disorder
American women fashion designers
21st-century American Jews